Henry Crozier Keating Plummer FRS FRAS (24 October 1875 – 30 September 1946) was an English astronomer.

Early years and education
Born in Oxford, Plummer was the son of William Edward Plummer (1849–1928) and nephew of the distinguished astronomer John Isaac Plummer (1845-1925). He gained his education at St. Edward's School and then Hertford College at Oxford University. After studies in physics, he became a lecturer at Owen's College, Manchester, instructing in mathematics.

Career
In 1900, he became an assistant at the Radcliffe Observatory, Oxford, where his father had served previously. He remained there for most of the next twelve years, spending one year at Lick Observatory as a Research Fellow. 

In 1912, he was appointed to the position of Andrews Professor of Astronomy at Trinity College, Dublin, which carried with it the title of Royal Astronomer of Ireland. He was the last holder of both positions. He was the director of the Dunsink Observatory from 1912 to 1920.

He joined the Military College of Science at Woolwich in 1921, as professor of mathematics. He would remain at Woolwich until he retired in 1940, becoming President of the Royal Astronomical Society from 1939 until 1941.

During his career he contributed to the Astrographic Catalogue, and contributed scientific papers. His investigations included photometric observations of short-period variables, and the radial pulsations of cepheid variables. 

In 1911, he developed a gravitational potential function that can be used to model globular clusters and spherically-symmetric galaxies, known as the Plummer potential. In 1918 he published the work, An Introductory Treatise on Dynamical Astronomy. 

He also made studies of the history of science, and served on the Royal Society committee that was formed to publish the papers of Sir Isaac Newton.

Awards and honors
 Fellow of the Royal Society, 1920
 Fellow of the Royal Astronomical Society, 1899. 
 The crater Plummer on the Moon is named after him.

References

General
 W. M. Smart, (Plummer, Henry Crozier Keating) Obituary, Monthly Notices of the Royal Astronomical Society, vol. 107, February 1947, pp. 56–59.

Publications

On the Theory of Aberration and the Principle of Relativity, 1910, Monthly Notices of the Royal Astronomical Society, Vol. 70, pp. 252–266

External links
 John Isaac Plummer with a brief biography of Henry.
 Mr. Henry C. K. Plummer, M.A., Hertford College, Oxford The St. Edward's School Chronicle, No. 312, Vol. XII. May, 1912.

1875 births
1946 deaths
Academics of the University of Oxford
Alumni of Hertford College, Oxford
Directors of Dunsink Observatory
20th-century British astronomers
Fellows of the Royal Society
Fellows of Trinity College Dublin
Irish astronomers
People educated at St Edward's School, Oxford
People from Oxford
Presidents of the Royal Astronomical Society